The Klingenbachtal Nature Reserve in North Rhine-Westphalia, Germany, consists of 27.44 hectares to the west of Scherfede within municipal area of Warburg located in Höxter. The area was designated as a nature reserve (NSG) in 2002 by the regional government of Detmold. The Bundesautobahn 45 cuts through this NSG. Since 2004 the NSG has been a subarea of the Birds Directive of the European Union (abbreviated as Egge) under NR. DE-4419-401 in the European Union reserve system Natura 2000

Description

The NSG is predominantly forest bordering the Diemel with its source area and its smaller grassland areas. The forest mostly consists of Luzulo-European Beech. In Klingelbach there are creek-ash-alder woods (Bach-Eschen-Erlenwälder) and Alder swamp forests (Erlen-Bruchwälder). There are several species of plants and animals within the forest which have been found to be vulnerable.

External links 
 

Nature reserves in North Rhine-Westphalia
Höxter (district)